Crooked Lettaz was an American hip hop duo from Jackson, Mississippi, composed of Brad "Kamikaze" Franklin and Lavell David Banner Crump.

In 1998, Crooked Lettaz signed to independent label Penalty Recordings. Later that same year, the duo's first promotional-only single, "Caught Up In The Game", was released followed by 1999's two-track single, "Firewater" (featuring Noreaga)/"Get Crunk" (featuring Pimp C from UGK). Crooked Lettaz's full-length album, Grey Skies, was released on April 20, 1999, peaking at #75 on the Billboard's R&B chart.

After the release of the album, Banner and Kamikaze embarked on solo careers.

Discography

References

American hip hop groups
Musical groups from Mississippi
Southern hip hop groups
American musical duos
Hip hop duos
Musical groups established in 1998
Musical groups disestablished in 2000
African-American musical groups